"Slipping Away" is a Top 40 pop song performed by Welsh singer/guitarist Dave Edmunds. The song was written and produced by Jeff Lynne of Electric Light Orchestra fame and was included on Edmunds' 1983 album Information. "Slipping Away" was released as a single and became Edmunds' second and final Top 40 single in the US, following 1970's "I Hear You Knocking".

"Slipping Away" reached number 39 on the Billboard Hot 100, number 7 on the Mainstream Rock Chart, and number 60 on the UK Singles Chart. The song has since appeared on several 1980s music compilations. The song's music video was directed by Peter Sinclair.

Track listing
7" and 12" Vinyl
 "Slipping Away" – 4:20
 "Don't Call Me Tonight" – 2:26

Personnel
Dave Edmunds - guitar, vocals
John David - bass
Dave Charles - drums
Richard Tandy - synthesizer

Chart history

See also
List of songs produced by Jeff Lynne

References 

1983 singles
Dave Edmunds songs
Songs written by Jeff Lynne
Song recordings produced by Jeff Lynne
1983 songs
Arista Records singles
Columbia Records singles